The fifth edition of the Men's Asian Amateur Boxing Championships was held from 27 August to 1 September 1971 in Tehran, Iran.

Medal summary

Medal table

References

External links
Asian Boxing Confederation

Asian Amateur Boxing Championships
Asian Boxing
Boxing
1971 Asia